Alex "Izzy" Izykowski (born January 26, 1984) is an American short track speed skater. He competed in the 2006 Winter Olympics of Turin in the 1500m, and was also part of the bronze medal winning 5000m relay.

External links
Alex Izykowski at ISU

References 
 
 Alex's U.S. Olympic Team bio

1984 births
American male short track speed skaters
Living people
Short track speed skaters at the 2006 Winter Olympics
Olympic bronze medalists for the United States in short track speed skating
Medalists at the 2006 Winter Olympics
American male speed skaters
21st-century American people